Marnel "Mac" Baracael (born April 14, 1985) is a Filipino professional basketball player who last played for the MisOr Kuyamis of the Pilipinas VisMin Super Cup. Baracael was drafted sixth overall by the Alaska Aces in the 2011 PBA draft. Baracael played college basketball in FEU.

Amateur career
Baracael was a former cager of MSEUF. In 2006, Baracael, also known as “Macmac”, transferred to Far Eastern University of the UAAP. After serving his residency, he became part of the FEU Tamaraws Senior basketball team on the account of his agility, one-on-one defense and outside shooting.

Shooting/apparent attempted assassination
On July 24, 2008, Baracael was shot by an unidentified assailant. He was walking outside the FEU campus in front of a PhilTrust Bank branch, in the corner of Morayta and R. Papa St. Marnel, Barcael was with his teammates Ron Cabagnot and Robert Kave when the suspect fired two gunshots. One bullet hit the left side of the player's back and the bullet exited from the lower portion of his nipple. Baracael was rushed to the Mary Chiles Hospital but was later on transferred to Capitol Medical Center. Allegedly, he was shot not only to warn him or scare him but it was intended to put the player to complete silence. Motives behind the attempted assassination are still unknown, but it was believed that the incident was related to a game-fixing issue that Baracael said to have reported earlier to FEU management.

Smart Gilas
Alongside his FEU teammates Mark Barroca and Aldrech Ramos, Baracael was part of the roster of the national team, Smart Gilas, headed by coach Rajko Toroman. He led the team in scoring to help Smart Gilas finish second place in the 22nd Dubai Invitational Basketball Tournament.

PBA career

Alaska Aces
He along with 33 other rookies led by teammate JVee Casio applied for the draft. On draft day, he was taken 6th overall by the Alaska. He then signed a three-year deal with the team. In his official debut as a professional in the PBA, Baracael led the scoring for Alaska with 20 points, 2 rebounds and 3 assists in an 83–72 loss against the Barangay Ginebra Kings.

Barangay Ginebra San Miguel
In January 2013, Baracael was traded to Barangay Ginebra in a 5-team, 10-player deal.

Barako Bull Energy
On September 28, 2015, Baracael was traded to the Barako Bull Energy in a three-team trade that also involved the Star Hotshots.

NLEX Road Warriors
On May 5, 2016, Baracael, Emman Monfort and a 2018 second-round  pick was traded by the Phoenix Fuel Masters to the NLEX Road Warriors for Simon Enciso and Mark Borboran.

PBA career statistics

Correct as of September 23, 2016

Season-by-season averages

|-
| align=left | 
| align=left | Alaska
| 35 || 23.8 || .412 || .312 || .785 || 3.4 || 1.1 || .2 || .1 || 9.0
|-
| align=left | 
| align=left | Alaska
| 57 || 21.8 || .388 || .330 || .780 || 2.7 || 1.0 || .2 || .0 || 8.2
|-
| align=left| 
| align=left | Barangay Ginebra
| 42 || 20.9 || .368 || .348 || .711 || 2.0 || 1.2 || .3 || .1 || 7.2
|-
| align=left | 
| align=left | Barangay Ginebra
| 33 || 20.6 || .379 || .358 || .600 || 2.9 || 1.2 || .2 || .1 || 7.0
|-
| align=left | 
| align=left | Barako Bull / Phoenix / NLEX
| 34 || 16.4 || .397 || .317 || .711 || 2.2 || .8 || .2 || .1 || 6.4
|-class=sortbottom
| align=center colspan=2 | Career
| 201 || 20.8 || .389 || .337 || .738 || 2.6 || 1.1 || .2 || .1 || 7.6

References

1985 births
Living people
Alaska Aces (PBA) players
Barangay Ginebra San Miguel players
Barako Bull Energy players
Basketball players at the 2010 Asian Games
Basketball players from Quezon
NorthPort Batang Pier players
Meralco Bolts players
NLEX Road Warriors players
Philippine Basketball Association All-Stars
Philippines men's national basketball team players
Filipino men's basketball players
Phoenix Super LPG Fuel Masters players
Small forwards
FEU Tamaraws basketball players
Asian Games competitors for the Philippines
Maharlika Pilipinas Basketball League players
Alaska Aces (PBA) draft picks